Christy Elliot (24 February 1933 – 5 September 2020) was a Scotland international rugby union player.

Rugby Union career

Amateur career

He played for Langholm. During his time at Langholm, the club won the Scottish Unofficial Championship in the 1958–59 season and the Border League in that same season, as well as the Langholm Sevens.

Elliot won a further 5 Sevens winners medals on the Border Sevens Circuit: winning Kelso Sevens once, Gala Sevens twice, Selkirk Sevens once and Earlston Sevens once.

He first played for Langholm as a 15-year-old in 1947, and last played for the club in 1972, 25 years later.

He also played for the Barbarians 3 times.

Provincial career

He played for South of Scotland District.

He captained the Combined Scottish Districts side in 1965, playing against South Africa. The Districts side won 16–8.

International career

He was capped for  twelve times between 1958 and 1965.

Military career

He did his national service in Korea with the King's Own Scottish Borderers.

Business career

He became a tweed manager with Arthur Bell & Sons in Langholm.

Family

His brother Tom Elliot was also capped for Scotland.

References

Sources

 Bath, Richard (ed.) The Scotland Rugby Miscellany (Vision Sports Publishing Ltd, 2007 )

1933 births
2020 deaths
Barbarian F.C. players
Langholm RFC players
Rugby union players from Langholm
Scotland international rugby union players
Scottish Districts (combined) players
Scottish rugby union players
South of Scotland District (rugby union) players
Rugby union wings